Matthew Wong (March 8, 1984 – October 2, 2019) was a Canadian artist. Self-taught as a painter, Wong received critical acclaim for his work before his death in 2019 at the age of 35. Roberta Smith, co-chief art critic at The New York Times, has praised Wong as "one of the most talented painters of his generation."

Biography
Wong was born in Toronto in 1984. His family emigrated to Hong Kong when Wong was seven. At the age of fifteen, his family returned to Canada, in part to support the treatment of Wong's autism. Wong then attended the University of Michigan, Ann Arbor, completing a degree in cultural anthropology in 2007. He returned to Hong Kong the same year. In 2010 he enrolled at the City University of Hong Kong School of Creative Media, receiving a Master of Fine Arts degree in photography in 2012.

Wong suffered from depression throughout his adult life. He died by suicide in 2019 at age 35 in Edmonton, Alberta.

Art career
Wong's creative work began with experiments with photography in 2009 and continued during his time as a student of photography at City University in Hong Kong. Unsatisfied with the idea of becoming a photographer, in 2014 Wong told Neoteric Magazine that "towards the end of my degree I felt I had gained no real skills or prospects that could take me forward in the professional world."  In 2012 he began experimenting with drawing. He began painting landscapes in 2014.

In 2016 he returned to Canada, settling in Edmonton. Wong would post his paintings to Facebook. Through this, he met the curator and director of White Columns Gallery Matthew Higgs. Wong would go on to exhibit at galleries in New York and Hong Kong. Curator Jerry Saltz called Wong's 2018 solo exhibition at Karma Gallery “one of the most impressive solo New York debuts I’ve seen in a while.”

Due to their scarcity in the open market, Wong's works have attracted interest on the auction market. In 2020, a small watercolor on paper simply called Untitled was sold for four times its original estimate price after attracting a number of bids. His first large painting available in an auction, The Realm of Appearances, was sold in July 2020 for US$1.82 million, twenty times its original estimate. In December 2020, a painting called River at Dusk was sold for $4.86M, four times its original estimate.

His Edmonton studio remains untouched.

Solo exhibitions 
 2021 Blue View, Art Gallery of Ontario, Toronto
2019 Blue, Karma, New York
 2019 Day by Night, Massimo De Carlo, Hong Kong
 2018 Karma, New York
2018 galerie frank elbaz, Paris, France
 2015 Pulse of the Land, Hong Kong Visual Arts Centre, Hong Kong

Collections
His work is included in public collections such as the Metropolitan Museum of Art, the Museum of Modern Art, New York, the Dallas Museum of Art, the Aishti Foundation and the Estée Lauder Collection.

References

1984 births
2019 deaths
2019 suicides
Artists from Toronto
University of Michigan alumni
21st-century Canadian painters
Canadian male painters
Canadian expatriates in Hong Kong
Place of death missing
Painters who committed suicide
Canadian expatriates in the United States
Canadian landscape painters
Alumni of the City University of Hong Kong
Canadian male artists
Canadian contemporary artists
Suicides in Alberta
Hong Kong painters
Canadian people of Chinese descent
21st-century Canadian male artists